Charles LaCarda Riggins (born November 9, 1959) is a former defensive end in the National Football League. Riggins was drafted by the Green Bay Packers in the ninth round of the 1982 NFL Draft. He would later play with the Tampa Bay Buccaneers during the 1987 NFL season.

References

Sportspeople from Sanford, Florida
Tampa Bay Buccaneers players
American football defensive ends
Bethune–Cookman Wildcats football players
1959 births
Living people
Players of American football from Florida
National Football League replacement players